James Bartholomew Prendergast (August 23, 1917 – August 23, 1994) was a professional baseball player. He was a left-handed pitcher for one season (1948) in the major leagues, with the Boston Braves. Prendergast was born in Brooklyn, New York and died in Amherst, New York at the age of 77.

Career
Prendergast started his professional career at the age of 18, in the Pennsylvania State Association. He bounced around the minor leagues for a few years before pitching 1939–1941 in Southern Association. He spent the following four years serving in the United States Army.

Prendergast returned to baseball in 1946 with the Syracuse Chiefs of the International League; in 1947, he had the best season of his career, going 20–15 with a 3.08 earned run average. Prendergast joined the Braves in early 1948. However, he did not pitch well and was released in mid-season. He compiled a major league record of 1–1, with a 10.26 earned run average and 3 strikeouts in  innings pitched.

Prendergast's pitching declined after 1948. In 1951, he sued Major League Baseball for $150,000 to test the legality of the reserve clause. He never played professionally again.

References

External links

1917 births
1994 deaths
Augusta Tigers players
Baseball players from New York (state)
Birmingham Barons players
Boston Braves players
Brooklyn Technical High School alumni
Hollywood Stars players
Kansas City Blues (baseball) players
Little Rock Travelers players
Major League Baseball pitchers
Milwaukee Brewers (minor league) players
Seattle Rainiers players
Syracuse Chiefs players
United States Army personnel of World War II
Burials in Buffalo, New York